Incheon United FC is a South Korean professional football club based in Incheon that competes in the K League 1, the top flight of South Korean football. Founded in 2003, the club is a so-called "community club", with the government of the city of Incheon being its key shareholder. The club's home stadium is the Incheon Football Stadium.

History

Formation
Officially founded at the end of the 2003 season, the move to create a professional football club in Incheon had come about in part by the construction of the Incheon Munhak Stadium for the 2002 FIFA World Cup. Mayor of Incheon Ahn Sang-soo began the process of creating a new club in earnest in June 2003 with the official founding of Incheon FC. German Werner Lorant was appointed as manager in September of that year, assisted by Chang Woe-ryong and Kim Si-seok.

A public share issue was launched and ran from October to November 2003 and in December, the name Incheon United was adopted. Sponsorship contracts worth a total of $4m were signed with GM Daewoo and Daeduk Construction Company, while Puma supplied the club's kits.

Debut season
Lorant and his coaching staff recruited several high-profile players in a bid to make an impact on the league in the club's debut season in 2004. Goalkeeper Shim Bum-chul was recruited along with talented youngsters Choi Tae-uk, Kim Chi-woo and popular Japanese playmaker Masakiyo Maezono. The most high-profile of the imports was Turkish international defender Alpay Özalan, recruited from English Premier League side Aston Villa.

The club's first K-League match was a home encounter with Jeonbuk Hyundai Motors on 3 April 2004 which ended in a goalless draw. Their first league victory came in the third game of the season, also at home, as a Jasenko Sabitovic's own goal gave them a 1–0 victory over defending champions Seongnam Ilhwa Chunma.

Despite that promising start to the year, Incheon recorded just one more victory in the first stage of the season and finished bottom of the table on just nine points. Manager Lorant stepped down as manager at the end of August, and he was replaced in the hotseat by his assistant Chang Woe-Ryong as caretaker manager. Caretaker manager Chang Woe-Ryong made instant impacts on the side as the club finished fourth overall in the second stage of the league season, remaining in the race to claim victory in the stage until the final day.

Title challenge: Fly Up (2005)
Chang was confirmed as permanent Incheon manager in January 2005 as the club prepared to embark on what was to become a memorable season. The team finished runners-up in the first stage of the league season and joint third in the second stage of the K League, qualifying for the post-season championship playoffs by virtue of having the best overall record. Incheon were to face first stage winners Busan I'Park in the semi-final, and they easily defeated the southern side by a 2–0 scoreline to set up a championship final against Ulsan Hyundai Horang-i. In the first leg of the final at the Munhak stadium, goalkeeper Kim Lee-sub endured a torrid ninety minutes as Ulsan hit the back of the net five times in a stunning display of football, with Dženan Radončić netting a late consolation goal for the home side. Sung Kyung-mo replaced Kim Lee-sub in the Incheon goal for the second leg, and though United claimed a 2–1 victory they lost out on the title 6–3 on aggregate, but finished their second season in existence as K-League runners-up. This dramatic season was reproduced in a film, as a documentary film "Fly Up" was released on 14 December 2006

Incheon United also finished the 2005 season with the highest total and average home attendance in the league, with 316,591 spectators in total coming through the gates, an average of 24,353

Crisis
After a remarkable 2005 season, Incheon United failed to continue its success. Although they reached semi-final in the FA Cup for two consecutive seasons in 2006 and 2007, they failed to make the playoff. Before the 2009 season, Incheon United appointed Ilija Petković, who had managed Serbia-Montenegro in the 2006 FIFA World Cup as their manager and finished 5th in the league, proceeding to the K League Championship. However, they lost to Seongnam Ilhwa Chunma in the first round after a penalty shoot-out.

In the middle of the 2010 season, Petković suddenly resigned due to his wife's health problems. Three months later, Incheon United appointed Huh Jung-moo, who had just led South Korea to the Round of 16 in the 2010 FIFA World Cup, as their next manager. In the 2010 season, Incheon United produced their first ever K League Top Scorer as striker Yoo Byung-soo managed to score 22 goals in 28 appearances, becoming the youngest player in the K League history to win the award.

Before the 2012 season, Incheon United unveiled their new uniform which used blue as the main color and red lines on the shoulder, instead of their traditional blue and black stripes. Although the club explained that the design was created based on the inaugural season's uniform, supporters were furious with the club's decision to abandon their traditional stripes. Incheon manager Huh Jung-moo also lost fans' support as he openly expressed disagreement with the fans' concern over the issue. Huh Jung-moo eventually resigned in the middle of the season after a poor start. Kim Bong-gil took over as a caretaker manager and on 16 July 2012, he was officially appointed as the manager of the club.

Meanwhile, Incheon United suffered from a financial crisis. Rumors about the city of Incheon trying to sell the club were published through media. According to the reports, the club had been suffering from a budget deficit for years and the city could not afford to spend more on the club because of the 2014 Asian Games. It was also later revealed that the club had been failing to pay the wages for the players on time for two months. As a consequence, key players were forced out, such as Jung In-whan, Jeong Hyuk, Lee Kyu-ro, Han Kyo-won, Kim Nam-il and Ivo. Despite the hardships, Kim Bong-gil managed to save the club from relegation. However, the club decided to sack him after the 2014 season.

Incheon planned to appoint Lee Lim-saeng as their next manager, but he eventually refused to take the seat as he was concerned with the club's controversial sacking of Kim Bong-gil.

Kim Do-hoon era
Former legendary striker Kim Do-hoon replaced Kim Bong-gil on 13 January 2015. Kim Do-hoon enjoyed his debut season as a manager, leading Incheon to the FA Cup final for the first time ever. Despite losing 3–1 to FC Seoul, the club was praised by the media and was dubbed the "wolves" for their teamwork and fighting spirit.

Andersen era
After the departure of Kim Do-hoon, former North Korean national team coach Jørn Andersen became Incheon's manager and debuted in the 15th round against Jeonbuk Hyundai Motors on 7 July.

2020 season
Incheon United appointed Lim Wan-sup as their manager for the 2020 season.

Stadiums

Incheon United used Incheon Munhak Stadium, which was built for the 2002 FIFA World Cup from its debut season to 2011. However, as it was built as a multi-purpose stadium, it was too large and did not provide good view to the spectators. From 2012 season, they have been using the Incheon Football Stadium with the capacity of 20,891, which was built for the 2014 Asian Games.

Current squad

Out on loan

Retired number(s)

12 – Fans of the club (the 12th Man)

Coaching staff

Honours

Domestic competitions

League
K League 1
Runners-up (1): 2005

Cups
FA Cup
Runners-up (1): 2015

Season-by-season records

Key
Tms. = Number of teams
Pos. = Position in league

Managers

Shirt sponsors and manufacturers

See also
List of South Korean football clubs

References

External links

 Incheon United official website 

 
Association football clubs established in 2003
K League 1 clubs
Sport in Incheon
2003 establishments in South Korea